Bhabhi may refer to:

 Bhabhi (1938 film), a 1938 Hindi film
 Bhabhi (1957 film), a 1957 Hindi film
 Bhabhi (1991 film), a 1991 Hindi film
 Bhabhi (TV series), a 2002 Hindi TV series aired on StarPlus
 Savita Bhabhi, a 2008, highly controversial, mildly pornographic online cartoon strip series about a “bored Indian housewife”